La Más Completa Coleccion is a compilation album released by Marco Antonio Solís on January 26, 2009.

Track listing

Disc 1

All songs written and composed by Marco Antonio Solís

Disc 2
All songs written by Marco Antonio Solís

References

2009 compilation albums
Marco Antonio Solís compilation albums
Fonovisa Records compilation albums